Laura Robyn Langman  (born 16 April 1986) is a retired New Zealand international netball player, who last played domestic netball for the Sunshine Coast Lightning in the Australian Super Netball league. Primarily a midcourt player, Langman is a former captain and vice-captain of the New Zealand national netball team (nicknamed the Silver Ferns). She is the most capped player in the history of the Silver Ferns, having overtaken Irene van Dyk's record of 145 test matches in October 2018.

Early career
While still a student at Hillcrest High School in Hamilton, Langman was selected for the New Zealand U21 team. In 2003, she made her elite netball debut with the Waikato Bay of Plenty Magic in the National Bank Cup, and later that year was selected for the Silver Ferns.

Silver Ferns
Langman made her international test debut in 2005 against England. That year she captained the New Zealand U21 side to win gold at the World Youth Netball Championships in Fort Lauderdale, Florida. In the National Bank Cup, Langman won two premierships with the Magic in 2005 and 2006. She was also selected for the Silver Ferns team that won a gold medal at the 2006 Commonwealth Games in Melbourne.

The following year she made the Silver Ferns team to contest the 2007 Netball World Championships in Auckland, but almost had to withdraw with a foot injury. Langman recovered in time for the Championships, in which the Silver Ferns came in second behind Australia. She captained the Ferns several times in 2012, due to Casey Williams being injured, she also captained the 2012 New Zealand Fast5 team, where she led them to a gold medal against England.

Langman's decision to play for the Sunshine Coast Lightning in 2017 meant she was, amidst some controversy, not eligible to represent the national team. After much conjecture, Langman was granted an exemption by Netball New Zealand to play for the Silver Ferns in 2018/19. Ahead of the September 2018 Quad Series, Langman was elected by her fellow players and coaches as captain of the Silver Ferns. She captained the Ferns to the 2019 Netball World Cup championship, in what would be one of her last matches in the black dress before retiring from netball the following year.

Domestic career
With the start of the ANZ Championship, Langman remained with the Waikato Bay of Plenty Magic, who finished runners-up in 2008. She was named vice-captain of the Silver Ferns that year, and was elevated to acting co-captain following an injury to Julie Seymour. Although normally a wing defender, Langman became increasingly shifted into different areas of the midcourt to cover gaps left by injured players or personnel changes. In 2009, she earned her 50th test cap against England at the age of 23, and won a gold medal with the Silver Ferns at the 2009 World Netball Series in Manchester. The following year she won another gold medal with the Silver Ferns at the 2010 Commonwealth Games in Delhi. She was also named captain of the Waikato Bay of Plenty Magic for the 2010 ANZ Championship season, and continued in the role in 2011.The Magic took out the ANZ championship in 2012 beating the Melbourne Vixens. Laura played a very important part in the Magic as captain and playing the centre position with flair. On 19 August 2015, the New South Wales Swifts announced their acquisition of Langman for the 2016 ANZ Championship season.

In 2017, Langman moved to the Sunshine Coast Lightning, a newly created team in the Australian Super Netball league, where she was instrumental in winning the club's first premiership. Langman left the club at the end of the year and announced a break from the sport the following year. She returned to the Lightning for the 2019 season after being granted an exemption by Netball New Zealand to play in a foreign league and represent her country. She was named captain of the team. Langman retired from all levels of netball after the Lightning's loss in the 2020 preliminary final loss to the West Coast Fever.

In total Langman played more than 225 national league games across four clubs, the Waikato Bay of Plenty Magic, Northern Mystics, New South Wales Swifts and Sunshine Coast Lightning. The latter club's head coach, Kylee Byrne, stated "the legacy that [Langman] will leave at our club and the sport in general is monumental, one of netball’s greats has retired".

Personal honours
In the 2020 New Year Honours, Langman was appointed an Officer of the New Zealand Order of Merit, for services to netball.

Personal life

Langman is a trained Accountant by profession.  She meet husband Adrian Pooley at Wintec in 2009 when he took Langman for a fitness test.

References

External links 
 2011 ANZ Championship profile: Laura Langman
 

1986 births
Living people
New Zealand netball players
New Zealand international netball players
Commonwealth Games gold medallists for New Zealand
Netball players at the 2006 Commonwealth Games
Netball players at the 2010 Commonwealth Games
Netball players at the 2014 Commonwealth Games
Commonwealth Games silver medallists for New Zealand
Commonwealth Games medallists in netball
2007 World Netball Championships players
2011 World Netball Championships players
2015 Netball World Cup players
2019 Netball World Cup players
ANZ Championship players
Suncorp Super Netball players
New South Wales state netball league players
Waikato Bay of Plenty Magic players
Northern Mystics players
New South Wales Swifts players
Sunshine Coast Lightning players
New Zealand expatriate netball people in Australia
Sportspeople from Hamilton, New Zealand
Officers of the New Zealand Order of Merit
New Zealand international Fast5 players
National Bank Cup players
Medallists at the 2006 Commonwealth Games
Medallists at the 2010 Commonwealth Games
Medallists at the 2014 Commonwealth Games